This is a list of airlines currently operating in Iraq.

Scheduled airlines

See also
 List of defunct airlines of Iraq
 List of defunct airlines of Asia
 List of airlines
 List of Iraq Airspace ( Entry / Exit Points )

Iraq
Airlines
Airlines
Iraq